The Mangaaruhe River is a river of the Hawke's Bay Region of New Zealand's North Island. It flows southeast from the Ngamoko Range southwest of Lake Waikaremoana, flowing into the Wairoa River eight kilometres north of Frasertown.

See also
List of rivers of New Zealand

References

Rivers of the Gisborne District
Rivers of the Hawke's Bay Region
Rivers of New Zealand